Milo Manheim (born March 6, 2001) is an American actor. He is known for his starring role as Zed in the 2018 Disney Channel Original Movie Zombies, and its sequels Zombies 2 (2020) and Zombies 3 (2022). In 2018, he finished in second place on season 27 of Dancing with the Stars.

Personal life
Manheim was born and raised in Venice, Los Angeles, in California. He is the son of actress Camryn Manheim and former model Jeffrey Brezovar. He is Jewish and had his bar mitzvah ceremony, exploring the topic of "Activism at Any Age", with the Sholem Community, a secular Jewish Sunday school in Los Angeles, California. Manheim plays guitar, drums, piano, and ukulele, as well as various wind instruments.

Career
Manheim's acting career began at the age of six, in a local after-school program in Culver City. Since 2008, he starred in 20 different musicals with Liza Monjauze Productions. In 2009, he appeared in a three-line guest appearance on the CBS television series Ghost Whisperer alongside his mother. In 2017, he won "Outstanding Performance in a Leading Role" at the 2017 New York Musical Theatre Festival for his role in the musical "Generation Me". 

Manheim followed this up by being cast in a lead role in the Disney Channel television movie Zombies, which premiered on February 16, 2018. Manheim reprised his role as Zed in the sequel films, Zombies 2, which premiered on February 14, 2020, and Zombies 3 which was released on Disney+ on July 15, 2022.

On September 11, 2018, Manheim was announced as one of the celebrities to compete on season 27 of Dancing with the Stars. He was paired with professional dancer Witney Carson. On November 19, 2018, Manheim and Carson finished the competition in second place, losing to radio personality Bobby Bones.

In August 2022, Manheim was cast in a lead role, opposite Peyton List, in an upcoming Paramount+ series with the working title School Spirits.

Filmography

Awards and nominations

References

External links

2001 births
Living people
21st-century American Jews
21st-century American male actors
American male child actors
American male television actors
American male musical theatre actors
Jewish American male actors
Male actors from Los Angeles
People from Venice, Los Angeles